The 2016 4 Nations Cup was a women's ice hockey tournament held in Järvenpää, Kerava, and Vierumäki, Finland. It was the 21st edition of the 4 Nations Cup.

Results

Preliminary round

Bronze medal game

Gold medal game

Statistics

Final standings

External links
Tournament recap

2016
2016–17 in American women's ice hockey
2016–17 in Canadian women's ice hockey
2016–17 in Finnish ice hockey
2016–17 in Swedish ice hockey
2016–17 in women's ice hockey
2016